Abdeljalil El Hajji (born 28 June 1969 in Rabat, Morocco) is a retired Moroccan footballer. He played as a midfielder for Morocco.

External links
  Abdeljalil Hajji : Le Rouquin Chinois (Pages 40 and 41)

1969 births
Living people
Moroccan footballers
Footballers from Rabat
Moroccan expatriate footballers
Moroccan expatriate sportspeople in China
Expatriate footballers in China
Liaoning F.C. players
Sichuan Guancheng players
Shenzhen F.C. players
Chongqing Liangjiang Athletic F.C. players
Fath Union Sport players
Association football midfielders